Echembrotus was an ancient Arcadian Greek lyricist and poet. According to Pausanias, Echembrotus offered a bronze tripod to Heracles when the latter won at the Amphictyonic Games.

References

External links
 Echembrotus Inscription - Echembrotus Inscription from Demonax

Ancient Arcadian poets
Ancient Greek lyric poets
Heracles